Pien Sanders (born 11 June 1998) is a Dutch field hockey player who plays as a defender for Den Bosch and the Dutch national team.

Personal life
Pien Sanders grew up in Tilburg, Netherlands.

Sanders is sponsored by Brabo Hockey.

Career

Club hockey
In the Dutch Hoofdklasse, Sanders plays for HC Den Bosch.

National teams

Under–18
In 2015, Sanders was a member of the Netherlands U–18 side at the EuroHockey Youth Championship in Santander, Spain. At the tournament, Sanders won a gold medal with the team and was awarded Player of the Tournament.

Under–21
Sanders was a member of the Netherlands Under–21 team at the 2016 FIH Junior World Cup in Santiago, Chile where the team won a silver medal.

Oranje Dames
Pien Sanders made her debut for the Oranje Dames in 2017, during a test series against Spain in Cádiz, Spain.

Since her debut, Sanders has medalled with the Dutch national team on three occasions, winning gold on each occasion. The medals came at the 2017 EuroHockey Championships in Amstelveen, Netherlands; at the 2016–17 FIH World League in Auckland, New Zealand; and at the 2018 Champions Trophy in Changzhou, China.

In 2019, Sanders appeared in the inaugural tournament of the FIH Pro League.

International goals

References

External links
 
 
 
 

1998 births
living people
Dutch female field hockey players
People from Udenhout
HC Den Bosch players
Field hockey players at the 2020 Summer Olympics
Olympic field hockey players of the Netherlands
Olympic gold medalists for the Netherlands
Medalists at the 2020 Summer Olympics
Olympic medalists in field hockey
20th-century Dutch women
20th-century Dutch people
21st-century Dutch women
Sportspeople from North Brabant